David Alonso López (November 24, 1977 – July 6, 2017) was a Mexican professional boxer who went by the nickname of The Destroyer. He held the IBA Middleweight title.

Professional career
On August 28, 2010 López beat the veteran Saúl Román to win the WBC CABOFE Middleweight Championship.

On March 19 at the Gimnasio de la AUT in Tampico López beat the tough challenger Michel Rosales to win the vacant NABA Light Middleweight title.

In June 2011, López lost to WBA super welterweight champion Austin Trout in June. López defeated compatriot Michel Rosales in a WBA eliminator on March 19. López (40-12, 23 KO) hadn't lost a fight since 2005, going on a 16-fight win streak over that time, and a lot of the guys he's beaten are warriors.

Death 
On July 6, 2017 López  was shot dead during an incident that took place in his native Nogales, Sonora. It was reported that he was travelling with a passenger just before midnight, when his truck was attacked by bullets. Lopez died immediately before the police arrived. The Red Cross paramedics attended to the second victim.

Professional boxing record

|-
|align="center" colspan=8|41 Wins (23 knockouts), 14 loss(s), 1 Draw, 0 No Contest 
|-
|align=center style="border-style: none none solid solid; background: #e3e3e3"|Res.|align=center style="border-style: none none solid solid; background: #e3e3e3"|Record|align=center style="border-style: none none solid solid; background: #e3e3e3"|Opponent|align=center style="border-style: none none solid solid; background: #e3e3e3"|Type|align=center style="border-style: none none solid solid; background: #e3e3e3"|Rd., Time|align=center style="border-style: none none solid solid; background: #e3e3e3"|Date|align=center style="border-style: none none solid solid; background: #e3e3e3"|Location|align=center style="border-style: none none solid solid; background: #e3e3e3"|Notes'
|-align=center
|Loss||41-14-1||align=left|José Uzcátegui
|
|
|
|align=left|
|align=left|
|-align=center
|style="background:#abcdef;"|Draw||41-13-1||align=left|Don George
|
|
|
|align=left|
|align=left|
|-align=center
|Win||41-13||align=left|Julio César García
|
|
|
|align=left|
|align=left|
|-align=center
|Loss||40-13||align=left|Austin Trout
|
|
|
|align=left|
|align=left|
|-align=center
|Win||40-12||align=left| Michel Rosales
|
|
|
|align=left|
|align=left|
|-align=center
|Win||39-12||align=left| Saúl Román
|
|
|
|align=left|
|align=left|
|-align=center

References

External links

1977 births
2017 deaths
Boxers from Sonora
Southpaw boxers
People from Nogales, Sonora
Middleweight boxers
Mexican male boxers
Deaths by firearm in Mexico
People murdered in Mexico
Male murder victims